The Carnation Contented Hour was a long-running radio music series, sponsored by the Carnation Milk Company, which premiered April 26, 1931 on the regional NBC West Coast network. The full network series began January 4, 1932, on the Blue Network and was broadcast for two decades until its final broadcast on CBS December 30, 1951.

With its opening theme, "Contented," the musical variety show featured Josef Pasternack conducting until he died of a heart attack during a rehearsal. Leroy Shield and other conductors played four-week tryouts until the network settled on Percy Faith and his orchestra. 

Performers varied but usually included Buddy Clark, vocalist; Reinhold Schmidt, bass; and Josephine Antoine, soprano. The announcer was Vincent Pelletier. The program's producers were Harry K. Gilman and C. H. Cottington.

Until October 24, 1932, the program featured Gene Arnold and Herman Larson, broadcast over NBC Blue on Mondays at 8 p.m. Clark joined the cast on October 31, 1932. From October 2, 1949, until December 30, 1951, it aired Sundays on the Columbia Broadcasting System On March 26, 1950, Dick Haymes became the program's host, and Jo Stafford became its "featured feminine singier".

WWII
During World War II, the Armed Forces Radio Service obtained rights to rebroadcast the program to military personnel. Recordings were made on 16" electrical transcription discs for playback at 33 rpm over AFRS. Commercial messages were edited out, and the program was re-titled The Melody Hour.

Ted Dale succeeded Faith as musical director in 1949. Dale brought a dramatic and theatrical quality to the program with energetic, colorful arrangements.

Jay Hickerson's The Ultimate History of Network Radio Programming and Guide to all Circulating Shows indicates the program aired on NBC at 8 p.m. from October 31, 1932, moving to 10 p.m. from November 21, 1932, until September 26, 1949. He reports that 43 recorded shows are available, 36 bearing dates.

References

Sources

External links
Jerry Haendiges Vintage Radio Logs: The Carnation Contented Hour

1930s American radio programs
1940s American radio programs
1950s American radio programs
NBC Blue Network radio programs
CBS Radio programs
NBC radio programs
American Forces Network radio programs
American music radio programs